Berlinda Tolbert is an American film and television actress. Tolbert is best known for her role as Jenny Willis Jefferson, the daughter of Tom and Helen Willis on the CBS sitcom The Jeffersons, which originally aired from 1975 until 1985.

Early life and education
Tolbert majored in theater at the University of North Carolina School of the Arts in Winston-Salem. She also studied drama in London.

Career
In a 2013 interview, Tolbert stated, "I’ve only had one job in my entire life… professional actress." She got her first film part from Martin Scorsese in Mean Streets in 1973, when she was in acting school.

The Jeffersons
On The Jeffersons, Tolbert played Jenny, the daughter of interracial couple Tom and Helen Willis. Jenny had become engaged to Lionel Jefferson, the son of George and Louise, when they were still characters on Norman Lear's "All In The Family". They married and had a daughter. Tolbert played the role of Jenny for the run of the series, from 1975-1985. Tolbert was born just one day after Mike Evans (1949–2006), the original actor who played her boyfriend/husband Lionel. They were also both born in North Carolina. , Tolbert, Marla Gibbs, Jay Hammer and Damon Evans (Lionel #2) are the last surviving members of The Jeffersons main cast.

Later career
In 1981, Tolbert competed for the CBS team on Battle of the Network Stars. In 1983, Tolbert starred in the Maya Angelou play On A Southern Journey. Following the cancellation of The Jeffersons in 1985, Tolbert appeared in films including Harlem Nights, Goodfellas, and Patriot Games, and television shows including ER, Six Feet Under, and CSI: Crime Scene Investigation. Tolbert appeared in the 2011 indie film Last Ride on the Midwest Pacific.

Personal life
Tolbert married journalist Bob Reid in 1979.

Filmography

Film

Television

References

External links

Actresses from Charlotte, North Carolina
African-American actresses
American film actresses
American television actresses
Living people
University of North Carolina School of the Arts alumni
21st-century African-American people
21st-century African-American women
20th-century African-American people
20th-century African-American women
Year of birth missing (living people)